Postcards from America (sometimes styled as Post Cards from America) is a British and American independent film based on the books Close to the Knives and Memories That Smell Like Gasoline  by David Wojnarowicz.

The non-linear film presents sequences from three periods in the protagonist's life. The character, called only David, is portrayed by James Lyons in his adulthood, and by Michael Tighe and Olmo Tighe in his teenage and adolescent years.

Production
This marked the first project on which Christine Vachon and Pamela Koffler both worked. Koffler served as post-production producer on this film; the pair would form Killer Films, which released its first film the following year.

Marc Maurino, the writer and executive producer of FreeRayshawn (2020) worked on the film as an intern.

Release
Postcards from America premiered at the New York Film Festival in 1994. It also played at the Berlin, Sundance, and Toronto Film Festivals.

Reception
Postcards from America was awarded the International Confederation of Art Cinemas award at the Berlin Film Festival.

The film received mixed to negative reviews upon release. Many reviews knocked the film for portraying "Wojnarowicz as a passive, inarticulate victim." Variety described it as "(a) downer without much compensatory insight or dramatic power" in which "McLean shuffles and deals the cards from his deck in a highly selective manner and leaves far too many of them face down." In a review for The Advocate, Emanuel Levy concluded that Postcards "a dispassionate, uninvolving film" that "may be drenched in too much style, making the experience even more fractured and remote." Adrian Martin called it "a depressingly poor attempt at making a vivid, iconoclastic, stream-of-consciousness movie about some rather grim, relentless and preening ideas."

One favorable review commended it for the use of scenes in which characters address the audience, saying the device was better-utilized in Postcards than in The Sum of Us.

References

External links
 

1994 films
1994 drama films
1994 independent films
1994 LGBT-related films
1990s avant-garde and experimental films
American drama films
British LGBT-related films
American LGBT-related films
Films about male prostitution in the United States
Films produced by Christine Vachon
LGBT-related coming-of-age films
LGBT-related drama films
British drama films
1990s English-language films
1990s American films
1990s British films